Chor Voli is an Afghan card game, which was described by Gyula Zsigri in 1992.

Deal, Discard and Play

The game played by standard international pattern 52-card pack. The game played by four players. Before the deal each player takes one coin to the pool. Then they receive 13 cards each. From the 13 card each player must create 4 card groups, and discard one card. Then each player must show they groups by the order of these strength, one round is four turn. Who have the most valuable combination take one coin from the pool and win the turn. The next turn started by the winner of the last.

Combinations

The valid three-card combinations in descending order of strength are in the following chart.

If two players have the same valued combination, the that wins which takes the cards down later at the turn.

References

Comparing card games